Clair Horton Voss (September 16, 1920August 10, 1999) was an American lawyer and judge.  He was the first presiding judge of the Wisconsin Court of Appeals in District II, serving from 1978 through 1984.  He also served 30 years as a Wisconsin Circuit Court judge in Waukesha County and was a decorated veteran of World War II.

Early life
Voss was born in Antigo, Wisconsin, on September 16, 1920. He attended Marquette University and earned his Bachelor's degree.  At Marquette, he also played on the varsity football team.  He lived briefly in Chicago before being commissioned as an officer for service in World War II.

World War II

During the war, Voss was a platoon commander with Company A, 1st Battalion, 27th Marine Regiment, 5th Marine Division.  The unit received a Presidential Unit Citation for the Battle of Iwo Jima.  Lieutenant Voss was individually awarded the Navy Cross and Purple Heart for his actions in the battle, but he was grievously wounded—shrapnel from a mortar round lacerated his arms, legs, and head, severed his nose, and pierced his lung.  He was evacuated and spent the rest of the war recuperating.  He would carry shrapnel in his skull for the rest of his life.

Career

Following the war, Voss returned to school and earned his law degree from the Marquette University Law School in 1948.  He practiced law for several years, but, in 1956, took a job as an assistant district attorney in Waukesha County, thus beginning a career in public service that would last the rest of his life.  In 1960, Voss was elected to a newly created Wisconsin circuit court judgeship in the Waukesha-based 22nd circuit.  He would earn re-election in 1965, 1971, and 1977, and, when the court system of Wisconsin was reorganized in 1978, he was elected to the newly created Wisconsin Court of Appeals.  On the Court of Appeals, he was made presiding judge for the Waukesha-based District II. Shortly after his arrival on the court, his first wife, Betty, died. He then suffered a heart attack, underwent surgery, and was temporarily blind. The personal tragedies likely compounded his distaste for the appellate court's work.  He resigned in 1984, one year before the end of his term.

The next year, Judge Voss opted to return to the trial bench, running for election to the Wisconsin circuit court in Waukesha County.  He narrowly defeated incumbent Judge Jess Martinez, Jr., in the April 1985 election, and would go on to win re-election one more time in 1991.  He retired at the end of his second six-year term in this office, July 31, 1997.

Personal life and family
On May 27, 1944, Voss was married to Betty Kivlan, of Evanston, Illinois, in a military chapel in Quantico, Virginia.  After her death, in 1978, Voss married widow Joanne Foley.  Voss had three sons and a daughter with Betty Kivlan; Joanne Foley had six children from her first marriage.

Voss chaired the local affiliations of the American Red Cross and March of Dimes and was active in the American Legion, Veterans of Foreign Wars, Disabled American Veterans and the Legion of Valor of the United States of America, Incorporated. He was also active in his local church and coached grade school football and basketball teams.

Judge Voss died August 10, 1999, in Oconomowoc, Wisconsin.

Navy Cross citation
Lieutenant Voss was awarded the Navy Cross in October 1945 for his actions at Iwo Jima, the citation for the award reads:

The President of the United States takes pleasure in presenting the Navy Cross to Clair Horton Voss (0-38521), Second Lieutenant, U.S. Marine Corps (Reserve), for extraordinary heroism while serving with a Platoon of Company A, First Battalion, Twenty-Seventh Marines, FIFTH Marine Division, in action against enemy Japanese forces on Iwo Jima, Volcano Islands, on 27 February 1945. Although several previous attempts had failed to destroy a pillbox which had pinned down his platoon with heavy machine-gun fire during its advance toward the high ground to its immediate front, Second Lieutenant Voss realized that the enemy position was holding up the advance of the entire company. Arming himself with hand grenades and demolitions, he crawled forward to the rear of the pillbox where he succeeded in silencing the machine gun with hand grenades. Despite the heavy machine-gun fire from adjacent hostile positions, he approached the pillbox, climbed to the top and completely annihilated the remaining Japanese personnel with a demolition charge. By his initiative and courage, he made possible the continued advance of his company, and his gallant devotion to duty was in keeping with the highest traditions of the United States Naval Service.

Bureau of Naval Personnel Information Bulletin No. 343 (October 1945)

References

External links
 

|-

|-

|-

People from Antigo, Wisconsin
People from Waukesha County, Wisconsin
Wisconsin Court of Appeals judges
Military personnel from Wisconsin
United States Marines
United States Marine Corps personnel of World War II
Recipients of the Navy Cross (United States)
Marquette Golden Avalanche football players
Marquette University Law School alumni
University of Notre Dame alumni
1920 births
1999 deaths
20th-century American judges